The following is a list of transfers involving Israeli football clubs during the 2009–10 season.

Bnei Sakhnin

In

 Ahmed Saba - signed from  Hapoel Bnei Lod
 Bernard Dong Bortey - signed from  Hearts of Oak
 Nsumbu Mazuwa - signed from  Hapoel Tel Aviv
 Oshri Gita - signed from  Maccabi Haifa
 Tal Hen - signed from  Hapoel Tel Aviv
 Yaniv Luzon - signed from  Hapoel Petah Tikva

Out

 Bogdan Apostu - free agent
 Ilya Yavruyan - signed for  Maccabi Tel Aviv
 Islam Kana'an - signed for  Maccabi Ahi Nazareth
 John Jairo Culma - signed for  Maccabi Haifa
 Leonard Krupnik - signed for  Maccabi Haifa
 Maor Buzaglo - signed for  Maccabi Tel Aviv

Bnei Yehuda

In

 Aviran Dalal - signed from  Hapoel Bnei Lod
 Kfir Edri - signed from  Maccabi Herzliya
 Kobi Moyal - on loan from  Beitar Jerusalem
 Shai Nissim - on loan from  Beitar Jerusalem
 Tomer Hemed - on loan from  Maccabi Haifa

Out

 Cédric Bardon - signed for  Anorthosis Famagusta
 Idan Malichi - signed for  Maccabi Petah Tikva
 Imoro Lukman - signed for  AEP Paphos
 Nil Arbarbanel - signed for  Hakoah Ramat Gan
 Salem Abu Siam - free agent
 Yair Azulay - signed for  F.C. Ashdod
 Ze'ev Haimovich - signed for  Maccabi Netanya

Beitar Jerusalem

In

 Dario Fernandez - signed from  Panionios
 Eliran Danin - back from  Maccabi Haifa
 Moshe Ohayon - signed from  F.C. Ashdod
 Oral Cohen - signed from  Hapoel Petah Tikva
  Sebastián Abreu - signed from  River Plate

Out

 Gal Alberman - signed for  Borussia Mönchengladbach
 Rômulo - signed for  Cruzeiro
 Sagi Strauss - signed for  Hapoel Nazareth Illit
  Sebastián Abreu - signed by  River Plate

Out on loan 

 Avi Reikan - on loan to  Hapoel Petah Tikva
 Eytan Tibi - on loan to  F.C. Ashdod
 Hen Azriel - on loan to  Hapoel Petah Tikva
 Junior Viza - on loan to  Hapoel Petah Tikva
 Kobi Moyal - on loan to  Bnei Yehuda
 Shai Haddad - on loan to  Hapoel Ramat Gan
 Shai Nissim - on loan to  Bnei Yehuda
 Yonathan Zada - on loan to  Hapoel Kfar Saba

F.C. Ashdod

In

 Eitan Tibi - on loan from  Beitar Jerusalem
 Moshe Ben Lulu - on loan from  Hakoah Ramat Gan
 Yair Azulai - on loan from  Bnei Yehuda
 Carlos Ceballos - signed from  Maccabi Ahi Nazareth
 Kweku Essien - signed from  Hearts of Oak

Out

 Moshe Ohayon - signed for  Beitar Jerusalem

Hakoah Ramat Gan

In

 Amir Abu Arar - signed from  Maccabi Be'er Sheva
 Ive Jeda - signed from  Hapoel Nazareth Illit
 Nil Arbarbanel - signed from  Bnei Yehuda
 Ofir Hemo - signed from  Ironi Rishon LeZion
 Alan Damian Bender - signed from  Ferro Carril Oeste
 Roman Haostov - signed from  Hapoel Marmorek
 Sharon Gromanso - signed from  Ironi Ramat HaSharon
 Tamir Por - signed from  Ironi Ramat HaSharon

Out

 Ariel Weizman - free agent
 Didi Ongar - signed for  Maccabi Petah Tikva
 Hamudi Kiyal - free agent
 Jandson dos Santos - signed for  Maccabi Ironi Kiryat Ata
 Alan Damian Bender - free agent
 Miki Atia - free agent
 Moshe Ben Lulu - signed for  F.C. Ashdod
 Raffi Cohen - signed for  Hapoel Ramat Gan
 William Soares - free agent

Ironi Kiryat Shmona

In

 Kwabena Agouda - signed from  Hapoel Bnei Lod
 Jair Céspedes - signed from  Universidad San Martín de Porres
 Ohad Algarbli - signed from  Maccabi Ironi Kiryat Ata
 Omer Peretz - signed from  Maccabi Tel Aviv
 Yossi Betzalel - signed from

Out

 Maor Peretz - back  Hapoel Tel Aviv
 Shavit Elimelech - signed for  Hapoel Petah Tikva
 Wiyam Amashe - signed for  Maccabi Ahi Nazareth
 Yossi Dora - signed for  Hapoel Haifa

Hapoel Petah Tikva

In

 Avi Reikan - on loan from  Beitar Jerusalem
 Elnatan Salami - signed from  Maccabi Herzliya
 Hen Azriel - on loan from  Beitar Jerusalem
 Junior Viza - on loan from  Beitar Jerusalem
 Kone Jakarte - signed from  Hapoel Haifa
 Nadiv Simantov - signed from  Hapoel Ra'anana
 Shavit Elimelech - signed from  Ironi Kiryat Shmona

Out

 Avi Peretz - free agent
 Daniel Heidman - free agent
 Lior Lansisky - free agent
 Manor Hassan - free agent
 Oral Cohen - signed from  Beitar Jerusalem
 Papi Kimoto - free agent
 Yaniv Luzon - signed for  Bnei Sakhnin

Hapoel Tel Aviv

In

 Ben Luz - signed from  Hapoel Kfar Saba
 Douglas Da Silva - signed from  Hapoel Kfar Saba
 Dudu Peles - back from  Hapoel Beer Sheva
 Eran Zahavi - back from  Ironi Ramat HaSharon
 Kfir Dar - signed from  Beitar Nes Tubruk
 Maor Peretz - back from  Ironi Kiryat Shmona
 Mahran Lala - signed from  Maccabi Ahi Nazareth
 Samuel Yeboah - signed from  Hapoel Kfar Saba
 Yaniv Mizrahi - signed from  Beitar/Shimshon Tel Aviv

Out

 Adi Sabag - free agent
 Amar Mantzur - free agent
 Baruch Dego - signed for  Maccabi Netanya
 Fábio Júnior Pereira - free agent
 Galil Ben Sha'anan - signed for  Hapoel Haifa
 Nsumbu Mazuwa - signed for  Bnei Sakhnin
 Shlomi Arbeitman - end of loan, destination still unclear
 Tal Hen - signed for  Bnei Sakhnin
 Ümit Gonzalez - back to  Fenerbahçe S.K.

Maccabi Haifa

In

 John Culma - signed from  Bnei Sakhnin
 Leonard Krupnik - signed from  Bnei Sakhnin
 Eyal Golsa - signed from  Beitar Nes Tubruk
 Shlomi Arbeitman - back from  Hapoel Tel Aviv
 Eden Ben Basat - back from  Hapoel Haifa

Out

 Diego Crosa - signed for  Colón de Santa Fe
 Eliran Danin - back to  Beitar Jerusalem
 Giovanni Rosso - signed for  Hajduk Split
 Renato - free agent
 René Lima - free agent

Out on loan 

 Oshri Gita - on loan to  Bnei Sakhnin
 Tomer Hemed - on loan to  Bnei Yehuda
 Tom Almadon - on loan to  Maccabi Ahi Nazareth

Maccabi Netanya

In

 Alain Masudi - signed from  Maccabi Tel Aviv
 Baruch Dego - signed from  Hapoel Tel Aviv
 Gary Assous - signed from  AS Cannes
 Ravid Gazal - signed from  Maccabi Tel Aviv
 Shalev Menashe - signed from  Maccabi Herzliya
 Ze'ev Haimovich - signed from  Bnei Yehuda

Out

 Avi Strool - signed for  K.S.C. Lokeren
 Jorge López Caballero - free agent

Maccabi Petah Tikva

In

 Didi Ongar - signed from  Hakoah Ramat Gan
 Idan Malichi - signed from Bnei Yehuda
 Omer Buchsenbaum - signed from  Maccabi Herzliya
 Pablo Bastianini - Signed from   Caracas FC
 Rotem Shemul - signed from  Hapoel Nazareth Illit
 Yahav Yulezri - Signed from  Maccabi Haifa
 Roberto Sanchez - signed from

Out

 Blessing Kaku - free agent
 Irakli Geperidze - signed for  Hapoel Haifa
 Nenad Savić - free agent
 Ohad Kadousi - signed for  Hapoel Be'er Sheva
 Xavier Dirceu - free agent
 Dovev Gabay - free agent

Maccabi Tel Aviv

In

 Maor Buzaglo - signed from  Bnei Sakhnin
 Guillermo Israilevich - signed from  Hapoel Kfar Saba
 Igor Tomašić - signed from  Levski Sofia
 Ilya Yavruyan - signed from  Bnei Sakhnin
 Karlen Abramov - signed from  Navbahor Namangan
 Dulee Johnson - signed from  AIK Fotboll

Out

 Alain Masudi - signed for  Maccabi Netanya
 Amiran Shkalim - signed for  Hapoel Kfar Saba
 Erez Mesika - signed for  AEK Larnaca
 Joe Bizera - back to  Cagliari
 Kobi Mussa - free agent
 Omer Peretz - signed for  Ironi Kiryat Shmona
 Ravid Gazal - signed for  Maccabi Netanya

See also
 2008–09 Israel State Cup
 2008–09 Toto Cup Al

Israeli
Transfers
Israeli
2008-09